Schifflange is a commune and town in south-western Luxembourg. It is part of the canton of Esch-sur-Alzette.

, the town of Schifflange has a population of 11,180.

Schifflange was formed on 15 August 1876, when it was detached from the commune of Esch-sur-Alzette.  The law forming Schifflange was passed on the 6 July 1876.

Steelworks

A steelworks in Schifflange was founded in 1871 by the Metz family as Usine METZ (Esch-Schifflange), the steelworks became part of ARBED in 1911. In the 1980s the plant was converted to the continuous casting of blooms, then in the 90s an electric furnace installed. In 1994 the company merged with the Belgian company Métallurgique et Minière de Rodange-Athus (MMRA) forming ARES (Aciéries Rodange Esch-Schifflange). In the first decade of the 21st century ownership passed from Arcelor to ArcelorMittal, in 2008 becoming ArcelorMittal Rodange and Schifflange S.A. together with the plant in Rodange.

Population

Notable people
Gilles Müller, an ATP Tour tennis player.
Miralem Pjanić, footballer with FC Schifflange 95.
Monique Scheier-Schneider, secretary of the Luxembourg Ice Hockey Federation.

Twin towns — sister cities

Schifflange is twinned with:
 Drusenheim, France

References

External links
 
 Official website

 
Communes in Esch-sur-Alzette (canton)
Towns in Luxembourg